Kamilla Mammadova (born 31 August 1996) is an Azerbaijani women's football defender, who plays forKAdana İdman Yurdu in the Turkish Women's Super League and is a member of the Azerbaijan  women's national team.

Club career 
Mammadova played for Ugur FC in her country. Mid February 2017, she moved to Turkey, and signed with Adana İdman Yurdu. Mid December 2021, she went to Turkey again, and joinedKdz. Ereğli Belediye Spor to play in the Turkish Women's Super League. In the 2022-23 Super League season, she transferred to her former club Adana İdman Yurdu.

See also 
List of Azerbaijan women's international footballers

References

External links 

1996 births
Living people
Women's association football defenders
Azerbaijani women's footballers
Azerbaijan women's international footballers
Azerbaijani expatriate footballers
Azerbaijani expatriate sportspeople in Turkey
Expatriate women's footballers in Turkey
Turkish Women's Football Super League players
Adana İdmanyurduspor players
Karadeniz Ereğlispor players